Muhammad Abdul Bari (1930 – 4 June 2003) was a Bangladeshi academic, linguist and Islamic scholar.

Background and education
Bari was born in 1930, to a Bengali Muslim family in the village of Syedpur in Shibganj, Bogra District, Bengal Province. His grandfather, Sayed Abdul Hadi, had founded the village of Nurul Huda in Dinajpur and was one of the pioneers of the Ahl-i Hadith movement in Bengal. His father, Muhammad Abdullahil Baqi, was the vice-president of Muslim League, a member of Bengal Legislative Assembly, Pakistan General Assembly and East-Pakistan Legislative Council.

Bari passed the Islamic intermediate examination from Dhaka Intermediate Government College (now Kazi Nazrul Islam College) in 1946. He completed his bachelor's and master's in Arabic from the University of Dhaka in 1949 and 1950 respectively. He then moved to Oxford University to conduct research under the two orientalists professor Hamilton Alexander Rosskeen Gibb and professor Joseph Schacht. He obtained the DPhil degree in 1953.

Career
Bari served as a teacher during 1954–1977 and as an academic administrator during 1977–1996. He was appointed the vice-chancellor of Rajshahi University twice in 1971 and in 1977 and of Bangladesh National University in 1992. He was also the chairman of Bangladesh University Grants Commission during 1981–1989. He was head member of Islamic University establishing Planning Committee in January 1977.

Awards
 Nilkanta Sarkar Gold Medal
 Bahrul Ulum Ubaidi Suhrawardi Gold Medal
 Dhaka University Gold Medal
 President's Gold Medal (1969)

References

1930 births
2003 deaths
People from Dinajpur District, Bangladesh
Bangladeshi people of Arab descent
University of Dhaka alumni
Academic staff of the University of Rajshahi
Vice-Chancellors of the University of Rajshahi
Vice-Chancellors of National University Bangladesh
20th-century Bengalis
Bangladeshi Sunni Muslim scholars of Islam
Bengali Muslim scholars of Islam